Good As You is a support and social group for LGBT people and others questioning their sexuality in Bangalore. It started in 1994 and is one of the longest surviving groups that advocates equal rights for homosexuals and other sexual minorities in Bangalore.

History
In 1994, a few LGBT rights activists gathered at a local restaurant and decided to have a discussion forum for the sexual minorities at Bangalore. Within a week, it was decided that the group name would be Good As You, and meetings started taking place weekly. Samraksha, an AIDS counselling center, provided their office space for the meetups. Currently the weekly meetups happen at Swabhava office.

Activities

 Good As You is patron to an LGBT newsletter called Sangha Mitra which is published from Bangalore. Three issues have been printed so far.
 Good As You helped students of National Law School of India, University to organise the country's first Gay Rights Seminar in 1997.
 Good As You also co-sponsored "Emerging Gay Spaces in Bangalore" (a bi-lingual public lecture in English and Kannada, co-sponsored with Sabrang) in 1998. 
 Various picnics and social meetings have been organised by members of Good As You on different occasions bringing the community closer together.
 30 November 2000. Presentation by Dr. Shekhar Seshadri on child abuse.
 17 December 2000. Manish leads the first bakery workshop.
 July 1, 2001, Good As You members took part in the public meeting 'Breaking the Silence: Sexuality Minorities Speak Out', organised by the Coalition for Sexuality Minority Rights.
 Queer friendly poetry readings at Urban Solace on Tuesday nights 
 Queer Bowling League: Wednesdays 8.30pm at Amoeba, Church Street
 Good As You meetings: Thursdays 7pm-9pm at Swabhava. They discuss various topics that effect Queer people in India, from Sec.377 to cultural prejudice against unmarried people.
 Pink Divas dance workshops: Swabhava on Friday evenings
 "Married & Queer" sub-group of Goodasyou has queer people entangled in heterosexual marriages.
 Film screenings at Swabhava every Saturday 6PM onwards.
 Gay Runners & Brunch: Sundays Cubbon Park 9:30; Airlines 10:30 - 12:30
 In June/July 2015, Members of Goodasyou organized free hugs and missed call campaigns

Support
Good As You provides legal and moral support. Counselling is provided for LGBT people and other sexual minorities as well as HIV infected people.

See also

 LGBT culture in Bangalore

References

External links
 GoodAsYou blog

LGBT organisations in India